Waco is the county seat of McLennan County, Texas, United States. It is situated along the Brazos River and I-35, halfway between Dallas and Austin. The city had a 2020 population of 138,486, making it the 22nd-most populous city in the state. The 2021 U.S. Census population estimate for the city was 139,594. The Waco metropolitan statistical area consists of McLennan and Falls counties, which had a 2010 population of 234,906. Falls County was added to the Waco MSA in 2013. The 2021 U.S. census population estimate for the Waco metropolitan area was 280,428.

History

1824–1865
Indigenous peoples occupied areas along the river for thousands of years. In historic times, the area of present-day Waco was occupied by the Wichita Indian tribe known as the "Waco" (Spanish: Hueco or Huaco).

In 1824, Thomas M. Duke was sent to explore the area after violence erupted between the Waco people and the European settlers.
His report to Stephen F. Austin, described the Waco village:

After further violence, Austin halted an attempt to destroy their village in retaliation. In 1825, he made a treaty with them.
The Waco were eventually pushed out of the region, settling north near present-day Fort Worth. In 1872, they were moved onto a reservation in Oklahoma with other Wichita tribes. In 1902, the Waco received allotments of land and became official US citizens.
Neil McLennan settled in an area near the South Bosque River in 1838. Jacob De Cordova bought McLennan's property and hired a former Texas Ranger and surveyor named George B. Erath to inspect the area. In 1849, Erath designed the first block of the city. Property owners wanted to name the city Lamartine, but Erath convinced them to name the area Waco Village, after the Indians who had lived there. In March 1849, Shapley Ross built the first house in Waco, a double-log cabin, on a bluff overlooking the springs. His daughter Kate was the first settler child born in Waco. Because of this, Ross is considered to have been the founder of Waco, Texas.

1866–1900

In 1866, Waco's leading citizens embarked on an ambitious project to build the first bridge to span the wide Brazos River. They formed the Waco Bridge Company to build the  brick Waco Suspension Bridge, which was completed in 1870. The company commissioned a firm owned by John Augustus Roebling in Trenton, New Jersey, to supply the bridge's cables and steelwork and contracted with Mr. Thomas M. Griffith, a civil engineer based in New York, for the supervisory engineering work. The economic effects of the Waco bridge were immediate and large. The cowboys and cattle-herds following the Chisholm Trail north, crossed the Brazos River at Waco. Some chose to pay the Suspension Bridge toll, while others floated their herds down the river. The population of Waco grew rapidly, as immigrants now had a safe crossing for their horse-drawn carriages and wagons. Since 1971, the bridge has been open only to pedestrian traffic and is in the National Register of Historic Places.

In the late 19th century, a red-light district called the "Reservation" grew up in Waco, and prostitution was regulated by the city. The Reservation was suppressed in the early 20th century. In 1885, the soft drink Dr Pepper was invented in Waco at Morrison's Old Corner Drug Store.

In 1845, Baylor University was founded in Independence, Texas. It moved to Waco in 1886 and merged with Waco University, becoming an integral part of the city. The university's Strecker Museum was also the oldest continuously operating museum in the state until it closed in 2003, and the collections moved to the new Mayborn Museum Complex. In 1873, AddRan College was founded by brothers Addison and Randolph Clark in Fort Worth. The school moved to Waco in 1895, changing its name to Add-Ran Christian University and taking up residence in the empty buildings of Waco Female College. Add-Ran changed its name to Texas Christian University in 1902 and left Waco after the school's main building burned down in 1910. TCU was offered a  campus and $200,000 by the city of Fort Worth to relocate there.

Racial segregation was common in Waco. For example, Greenwood Cemetery was established in the 1870s as a segregated burial place. Black graves were divided from white ones by a fence which remained standing until 2016.

In the 1890s, William Cowper Brann published the highly successful Iconoclast newspaper in Waco. One of his targets was Baylor University. Brann revealed Baylor officials had been importing South American children recruited by missionaries and making house-servants out of them. Brann was shot in the back by Tom Davis, a Baylor supporter. Brann then wheeled, drew his pistol, and killed Davis. Brann was helped home by his friends, and died there of his wounds.

In 1894, the first Cotton Palace fair and exhibition center was built to reflect the dominant contribution of the agricultural cotton industry in the region. Since the end of the Civil War, cotton had been cultivated in the Brazos and Bosque valleys, and Waco had become known nationwide as a top producer. Over the next 23 years, the annual exposition would welcome over eight million attendees. The opulent building which housed the month-long exhibition was destroyed by fire and rebuilt in 1910. In 1931, the exposition fell prey to the Great Depression, and the building was torn down. However, the annual Cotton Palace Pageant continues, hosted in late April in conjunction with the Brazos River Festival.

"The Crash at Crush" was a publicity stunt done by the Missouri–Kansas–Texas Railroad company (known as M-K-T or "Katy"), featuring two locomotives intentionally set to a head-on collision. Meant to be a family fun event with food, games, and entertainment, the Crash turned deadly when both boilers exploded simultaneously, sending metal flying in the air. Three people died and dozens were injured.

20th century

An African American man named Sank Majors was hanged from the Washington Avenue Bridge by a white mob in 1905. Another man, Jim Lawyer, was attacked with a whip because he objected to the lynching. In both cases the mob was assisted by Texas Rangers.

In 1916, a Black teenager named Jesse Washington was tortured, mutilated, and burned to death in the town square by a mob that seized him from the courthouse, where he had been convicted of murdering a white woman, to which he confessed. About 15,000 spectators, mostly citizens of Waco, were present. The commonly named Waco Horror drew international condemnation and became the cause célèbre of the nascent NAACP's anti-lynching campaign. In 2006, the Waco City Council officially condemned the lynching, which took place without opposition from local political or judicial leaders; the mayor and chief of police were spectators. On the centenary of the Lynching, May 15, 2016, the mayor apologized in a ceremony to some of Washington's descendants. A historical marker is being erected.

In the 1920s, despite the popularity of the Ku Klux Klan and high numbers of lynchings throughout Texas, Waco's authorities attempted to respond to the NAACP's campaign and institute more protections for African Americans or others threatened with mob violence and lynching. On May 26, 1922, Jesse Thomas was shot, his body dragged down Franklin street by a crowd some 6,000 strong and the corpse then burned in the public square behind city hall. In 1923, Waco's sheriff Leslie Stegall protected Roy Mitchell, an African American coerced into confessing to multiple murders, from mob lynching. Mitchell was the last Texan to be publicly executed in Texas, and also the last to be hanged before the introduction of the electric chair. In the same year, the Texas Legislature created the Tenth Civil Court of Appeals and placed it in Waco; it is now known as the 10th Court of Appeals.

In 1937, Grover C. Thomsen and R. H. Roark created a soft-drink called "Sun Tang Red Cream Soda". This would become known as the soft drink Big Red.

On May 5, 1942, Waco Army Air Field opened as a basic pilot training school, and on June 10, 1949, the name was changed to Connally Air Force Base in memory of Col. James T. Connally, a local pilot killed in Japan in 1945. The name changed again in 1951 to the James Connally Air Force Base. The base closed in May 1966 and is now the location of Texas State Technical College, formerly Texas State Technical Institute, since 1965. The airfield is still in operation, now known as TSTC Waco Airport, and was used by Air Force One when former US President George W. Bush visited his Prairie Chapel Ranch, also known as the Western White House, in Crawford, Texas.

In 1951, Harold Goodman founded the American Income Life Insurance Company.

On May 11, 1953, a violent F5 tornado hit downtown Waco, killing 114. As of 2011, it remains the 11th-deadliest tornado in U.S. history and tied for the deadliest in Texas state history. It was the first tornado tracked by radar and helped spur the creation of a nationwide storm surveillance system. A granite monument featuring the names of those killed was placed downtown in 2004.

In 1964, the Texas Department of Public Safety designated Waco as the site for the state-designated official museum of the legendary Texas Rangers law enforcement agency founded in 1823. In 1976, it was further designated the official Hall of Fame for the Rangers and renamed the Texas Ranger Hall of Fame and Museum. Renovations by the Waco government earned this building green status, the first Waco government-led project of its nature. The construction project has fallen under scrutiny for expanding the building over unmarked human graves.

In 1978, bones were discovered emerging from the mud at the confluence of the Brazos and Bosque Rivers. Excavations revealed the bones were 68,000 years old and belonged to a species of mammoth. Eventually, the remains of at least 24 mammoths, one camel, and one large cat were found at the site, making it one of the largest findings of its kind. Scholars have puzzled over why such a large herd had been killed at once. The bones are on display at the Waco Mammoth National Monument, part of the National Park Service.

On February 28, 1993, a shootout occurred in which six Branch Davidians and four agents of the United States Bureau of Alcohol, Tobacco, and Firearms died. After 51 days, on April 19, 1993, the standoff ended when the Branch Davidians' facility, referred to as Mt. Carmel, was set ablaze, thirteen miles from Waco. It is speculated that the combination of the flammable tear gas and gunshots shot at the facility by the law enforcement task-force potentially caused the fire.  74 people, including leader David Koresh, died in the blaze. This event became known as the Waco siege.

21st century
During the presidency of George W. Bush, Waco was the home to the White House Press Center.

On May 17, 2015, a violent dispute among rival biker gangs broke out at Twin Peaks restaurant. The Waco police intervened, with nine dead and 18 injured in the incident. More than 170 were arrested. No bystanders, Twin Peak employees, or officers were killed. This was the most high-profile criminal incident since the Waco siege, and the deadliest shootout in the city's history.

Geography 

Waco is located at 31°33'5" North, 97°9'21" West (31.551516, –97.155930).

The total area is 11.85% water.

Cityscape

Downtown Waco is relatively small when compared to other larger Texas cities, such as Houston, Dallas, San Antonio, or even Fort Worth, El Paso, or Austin. The 22-story ALICO Building, completed in 1910, is the tallest building in Waco.

Climate

Waco experiences a humid subtropical climate (Köppen climate classification Cfa), characterized by hot summers and generally mild winters. Some  temperatures have been observed in every month of the year.

Demographics

As of the 2020 United States census, there were 138,486 people, 50,108 households, and 29,014 families residing in the city.

At the census of 2010, 124,805 people resided in the city, organized into 51,452 households and 27,115 families. The population density was recorded as 1,350.6 people per square mile (521.5/km2), with 45,819 housing units at an average density of 544.2 per square mile (210.1/km2). The 2000 racial makeup of the city was 60.8% White, 22.7% African American, 1.4% Asian, 0.5% Native American, 0.1% Pacific Islander, 12.4% from other races, and 2.3% from two or more races. About 23.6% of the population was Hispanic or Latino of any race. Non-Hispanic Whites were 45.8% of the population in 2010, down from 66.6% in 1980.

In 2000, the census recorded 42,279 households, of which 29.5% had children under the age of 18 living with them, 38.4% were married couples living together, 16.2% had a female householder with no husband present, and 41.4% were not families. Around 31.1% of all households were made up of individuals, and 10.9% had someone living alone at 65 years of age or older. The average household size was calculated as 2.49 and the average family size 3.19.

In 2000, 25.4% of the population was under the age of 18, 20.3% from 18 to 24, 25.0% from 25 to 44, 16.0% from 45 to 64, and 13.4% who were 65 years of age or older. The median age was 28 years. For every 100 females, there were 91.4 males. For every 100 females age 18 and over, there were 87.3 males.

The median income for a household in the city was $26,264, and for a family was $33,919. Males had a median income of $26,902 versus $21,159 for females. The per capita income for the city was $14,584. About 26.3% of the population and 19.3% of families lived below the poverty line. Of the total population, 30.9% of those under the age of 18 and 13.0% of those 65 and older lived below the poverty line.

Government

Waco has a council-manager form of government. Citizens are represented on the City Council by six elected members; five from single-member districts and a mayor who is elected at-large. The city offers a full line of city services typical of an American city this size, including: police, fire, Waco Transit buses, electric utilities, water and wastewater, solid waste, and the Waco Convention and Visitors Bureau.

The Heart of Texas Council of Governments is headquartered in Waco on South New Road. This regional agency is a voluntary association of cities, counties, and special districts in the Central Texas area.

The Texas Tenth Court of Appeals is in the McLennan County Courthouse in Waco.

The Waco Fire Department operates 13 fire stations throughout the city.

The Texas Department of Criminal Justice operates the Waco Parole Office in Waco.

The United States Postal Service operates the Waco Main Post Office along Texas State Highway 6. In addition, it operates other post offices throughout Waco.

Economy

According to the Greater Waco Chamber of Commerce, the top employers in the city as of July 2015 are:

Culture

Libraries and museums

Waco is served by the Waco-McLennan County Library system. The Armstrong Browning Library, on the campus of Baylor University, houses collections of English poets Robert Browning and Elizabeth Barrett Browning. The Red Men Museum and Library houses the archives of the Improved Order of Red Men. The Lee Lockwood Library and Museum is home to the Waco Scottish Rite of Freemasonry. The Waco Mammoth National Monument is a paleontological site and museum managed by the National Park Service in conjunction with the City of Waco and Baylor University.

Other museums in Waco include the Dr Pepper Museum, Texas Sports Hall of Fame, Texas Ranger Hall of Fame and Museum, and the Mayborn Museum Complex.

Parks and recreation
A seven-mile scenic riverwalk along the east and west banks of the Brazos River stretches from the Baylor campus to Cameron Park Zoo. This multiuse walking and jogging trail passes underneath the Waco Suspension Bridge and captures the peaceful charm of the river. Lake Waco is a reservoir along the western border of the city. Cameron Park is a  urban park featuring playgrounds, picnic areas, a cross-country running track, and a disc golf course. The park also contains Waco's  zoo, the Cameron Park Zoo.

Attractions

Notable attractions in Waco include the Hawaiian Falls water park and the Grand Lodge of Texas, one of the largest Grand Lodges in the world. The Waco Suspension Bridge is a single-span suspension bridge built in 1870, crossing the Brazos River. Indian Spring Park marks the location of the origin of the town of Waco, where the Huaco Indians had settled on the bank of the river, at the location of an icy cold spring. The Doris Miller Memorial is a public art installation along the banks of the Brazos River. A nine-foot bronze statue of Miller was unveiled on December 7, 2017, temporarily located at nearby Bledsoe-Miller Park.

Downtown Waco is home to Magnolia Market, a shopping complex containing specialty stores, food trucks, and event space, set in repurposed grain silos originally built in 1950 for the Brazos Valley Cotton Oil Company. The Magnolia Market, operated by Chip and Joanna Gaines of the HGTV TV series Fixer Upper, saw 1.2 million visitors in 2016.

Education

Waco Independent School District serves most of the city of Waco. Portions of the city also lie in the boundaries of Midway Independent School District, Bosqueville ISD, China Spring ISD, Connally ISD, and La Vega ISD. Three large public high schools are in the Waco city limits: Waco High School (Waco ISD), University High School (Waco ISD), and Midway High School (Midway ISD). The schools are all rivals in sports, academics, and pride. Former high schools in Waco ISD were A.J. Moore High School, G.W. Carver High School, Richfield High School, Jefferson-Moore High School, and a magnet school known as A.J. Moore Academy.

Charter high schools in Waco include Harmony Science Academy, Methodist Children's Home, Premier High School of Waco, Rapoport Academy Public School, and Waco Charter School (EOAC). Local private and parochial schools include Live Oak Classical School, Parkview Christian Academy, Reicher Catholic High School, Texas Christian Academy, Vanguard College Preparatory School, and Waco Montessori School.

The three institutions of higher learning in Waco are:
 Baylor University
 McLennan Community College
 Texas State Technical College

In the past, several other higher education institutions were in Waco:
 A&M College
 AddRan Male & Female College (relocated to Fort Worth, now Texas Christian University)
 The Catholic College
 Central Texas College (HBCU)
 The Gurley School
 The Independent Biblical and Industrial School
 Paul Quinn College (HBCU) (relocated to Dallas)
 Provident Sanatarium
 Toby's Practical Business College
 The Training School
 Waco Business College

Local media

The major daily newspaper is the Waco Tribune-Herald. Other publications include The Waco Citizen, The Anchor News, The Baylor Lariat, Tiempo, Wacoan, and Waco Today Magazine.

The Waco television market (shared with the Killeen/Temple and Bryan/College Station areas) is the 89th-largest television market in the US and includes these stations:
KCEN 6 (NBC)
KWTX 10 (CBS)
KAMU 12 (PBS)
KXXV 25 (ABC)
KWKO 38 (Univision)
KWKT 44 (Fox)
KNCT 46 (CW)

The Waco radio market is the 190th-largest radio market in the US and includes:
KRMX-FM  92.9  (Country)
KWBT-FM  94.5  (Urban/Hip-Hop)
KBGO-FM  95.7  (Classic Hits)
KBGO-FM 95.7 HD-2 (Rhythmic Top-40) (Z-95.1)
KWRA-FM  96.7  (Spanish Religious)
KWTX-FM  97.5  (Pop)
WACO-FM  99.9  (Country)
KXZY-FM 100.7  (Spanish religious)
KBRQ-FM 102.5  (Rock)
KWBU-FM 103.3  (NPR)
KWOW-FM 104.1  (Spanish)
KBHT-FM 104.9  (Variety Hits)
KIXT-FM 106.7  (Classic Rock)
KWPW-FM 107.9  (Pop)
KBBW-AM 1010 / FM 105.9  (Religious/Talk Radio)
KWTX-AM 1230   (News talk)
KRZI-AM 1660 / FM 92.3   (ESPN)

Sports

The Baylor Bears athletics teams compete in Waco. The football team has won or tied for nine conference titles, and have played in 24 bowl games, garnering a record of 13–11. The women's basketball team won the NCAA Division I women's basketball tournament in 2005, 2012 and 2019. The men's basketball team won the NCAA Division I men's basketball tournament in 2021.

The Waco BlueCats, an independent minor league baseball team, planned to play in the inaugural season of the Southwest League of Professional Baseball in 2019. A new ballpark was planned for the suburb of Bellmead.

The American Basketball Association had a franchise for part of the 2006 season, the Waco Wranglers. The team played at Reicher Catholic High School and practiced at Texas State Technical College.

Previous professional sports franchises in Waco have proven unsuccessful. The Waco Marshals of the National Indoor Football League lasted less than two months amidst a midseason ownership change in 2004. (The team became the beleaguered Cincinnati Marshals the following year.) The Waco Wizards of the now-defunct Western Professional Hockey League fared better, lasting into a fourth season before folding in 2000. Both teams played at the Heart O' Texas Coliseum, one of Waco's largest entertainment and sports venues.

The Southern Indoor Football League announced that Waco was an expansion market for the 2010 season. It was rumored they would play in the Heart O' Texas Coliseum. However, the league broke up into three separate leagues, and subsequently, a team did not come to Waco in any of the new leagues.

Professional baseball first came to Waco in 1889 with the formation of the Waco Tigers, a member of the Texas League. The Tigers were renamed the Navigators in 1905, and later the Steers. In 1920, the team was sold to Wichita Falls. In 1923, a new franchise called the Indians was formed and became a member of the Class D Texas Association. In 1925, Waco rejoined the Texas League with the formation of the Waco Cubs.

On June 20, 1930, the first night game in Texas League history was played at Katy Park in Waco. The lights were donated by Waco resident Charles Redding Turner, who owned a local farm team for recruits to the Chicago Cubs.

On the night of August 6, 1930, baseball history was made at Katy Park: in the eighth inning of a night game against Beaumont, Waco left fielder Gene Rye became the only player in the history of professional baseball to hit three home runs in one inning.

The last year Waco had a team in the Texas League was 1930, but fielded some strong semipro teams in the 1930s and early 1940s. During the World War II years of 1943–1945, the powerful Waco Army Air Field team was probably the best in the state; many major leaguers played for the team, and it was managed by big-league catcher Birdie Tebbetts.

In 1947, the Class B Big State League was organized with Waco as a member called the Waco Dons.

In 1948, A.H. Kirksey, owner of Katy Park, persuaded the Pittsburgh Pirates club to take over the Waco operation, and the nickname was changed to Pirates. The Pirates vaulted into third place in 1948. They dropped a notch to fourth in 1949, but prevailed in the playoffs to win the league championship. The Pirates then tumbled into the second division, bottoming out with a dreadful 29–118, 0.197 club in 1952. This mark ranks as one of the 10 worst marks of any 20th-century full-season team. When the tornado struck in 1953, it destroyed the park. The team relocated to Longview to finish the season and finished a respectable third with a 77–68 record.

Waco has many golf clubs and courses, including Cottonwood Creek Golf Course.

In 2018, Bicycle World Texas IRONMAN 70.3 Waco held its inaugural event in the city on October 26.

Transportation

Interstate 35 is the major north–south highway for Waco. It directly connects the city with Dallas (I-35E), Fort Worth (I-35W), Austin, and San Antonio. Texas State Highway 6 runs northwest–southeast and connects Waco to Bryan/College Station and Houston. US Highway 84 is the major east–west thoroughfare in the area. It is also known as Waco Drive, Bellmead Drive (as it passes through the city of Bellmead), Woodway Drive or the George W. Bush Parkway. Loop 340 bypasses the city to the east and south. State Highway 31 splits off of US 84 just east of Waco and connects the city to Tyler, Longview, and Shreveport, Louisiana.

The Waco area is home to three airports. Waco Regional Airport (ACT) serves the city with daily flights to Dallas/Fort Worth International via American Eagle. TSTC Waco Airport (CNW) is the site of the former James Connally AFB and was the primary fly-in point for former President George W. Bush when he was visiting his ranch in Crawford. It is also a hub airport for L3 and several other aviation companies. McGregor Executive Airport (PWG) is a general-aviation facility west of Waco.

Local transportation is provided by the Waco Transit System, which offers bus service Monday-Saturday to most of the city. Nearby passenger train service is offered via Amtrak. The Texas Eagle route includes daily stops in McGregor, 20 miles west of the city.

Notable people

Sports

 Dwight Johnson, born and raised in Waco, was an NFL Defensive Lineman for the Philadelphia Eagles and the New York Giants
 Derrick Johnson, born and raised in Waco, was an NFL Linebacker for the Kansas City Chiefs
 Lee Ballanfant, born in Waco, was a Major League Baseball umpire
 Kwame Cavil, born in Waco, is a Canadian Football League wide receiver for the Edmonton Eskimos
 Perrish Cox, former NFL cornerback for the Tennessee Titans, was born in Waco, grew up in Waco, and went to University High School
 Zach Duke, graduated from Midway High School in Waco, is a former major league baseball pitcher for 9 teams between 2005 and 2019
 Dave Eichelberger, born in Waco, is a professional golfer who has won several tournaments on the PGA Tour and Champions Tour levels
 Casey Fossum, graduated from Midway High School in Waco, is a Major League Baseball player for the New York Mets
 Ken Grandberry, born in Waco, is a former NFL running back for the Chicago Bears
 Rufus Granderson, born in Waco, is a former AFL defensive tackle for the Dallas Texans
 Ty Harrington is the head coach for the Texas State University baseball team. He was born in Waco and attended Midway High School
 Andy Hawkins, born in Waco, is a former MLB pitcher
 Sherrill Headrick, born in Waco, came to the American Football League's Dallas Texans as an undrafted linebacker
 Michael Johnson, United States sprinter; graduated from Baylor University in 1990
 Jim Jones, born in Waco, American football player
 Rob Powell, fitness coach who has two certificates of Guinness World Records
 Dominic Rhodes, born in Waco, is a professional football running back who played for the Virginia Destroyers of the United Football League
 Bill Rogers, born in Waco, is a professional golfer who won the 1981 Open Championship and was voted 1981 PGA Tour Player of the Year
 LaDainian Tomlinson is a former NFL football player for the New York Jets and San Diego Chargers; born in Rosebud, he grew up in Waco, and went to University High School
 Will Grant, swimmer for the US National Junior Team, graduated from Waco High School and swam at Harvard.

Former pro baseball players from Waco

 Kevin Belcher August 8, 1967, CF-RF MLB 1990–1990
 Lance Berkman October 2, 1976, LF-RF MLB 1999–2011
 Buzz Dozier August 31, 1927, P MLB 1947–1949
 Louis Drucke March 12, 1888, P MLB 1909–1912
 Boob Fowler November 11, 1900, SS MLB 1923–1926
 Charlie Gorin June 2, 1928, P MLB 1954–1955
 Donald Harris December 11, 1967, CF-RF MLB 1991–1993
 Al Jackson December 25, 1935, P MLB 1959–1969
 Scott Jordan May 27, 1963, CF MLB 1988–1988
 Rudy Law July 10, 1956, OF MLB 1978–1986
 Dutch Meyer 10 June 1915 2B MLB 1940–1946
 Arthur Rhodes October 24, 1969, P MLB 1991–2011
 Schoolboy Rowe November 1, 1910, P MLB 1933–1949
 Ted Wilborn December 16, 1958, OF MLB 1979–1980
 Andy Cooper April 24, 1898  P NLB 1920–1939

Movies and television

 Jules Bledsoe, stage and screen actor and singer. When the Broadway premiere of Show Boat was delayed in 1927 by Ziegfeld, Paul Robeson became unavailable, so Bledsoe stepped in. He played and sang the role of Joe, introducing "Ol' Man River"
 Shannon Elizabeth, actress of American Pie fame, was born in Houston and grew up in Waco
 Chip and Joanna Gaines, Waco area home renovators and remodelers came to national attention with their TV show Fixer Upper. They have since expanded into a variety of local developments and are a major tourism draw for the Waco area
 Peri Gilpin, actress, best known for her television character Roz Doyle on the series Frasier, was born in Waco and raised in Dallas
 Texas Guinan, Hollywood actress from 1917 to 1933. She was active in vaudeville and theater, and was in many movies (often as the gun-toting hero in silent westerns, more than a match for any man). She also had a successful career as a hostess in nightclubs and speakeasies in New York City
 Anne Gwynne, Hollywood actress who starred in a number of films of the 1940s; she was born in Waco
 Thomas Harris, author of The Silence of the Lambs, was a student at Baylor University, and covered the police beat for the Waco Tribune-Herald
 Jennifer Love Hewitt, actress, was born in Waco
 Terrence Malick, director of The Thin Red Line, was raised in Waco. He also directed The Tree of Life, which was set in the town of Waco in the 1950s
 Steve Martin, comedian, actor, author and musician, was born in Waco
 Kevin Reynolds, director (Robin Hood: Prince of Thieves, The Count of Monte Cristo, Waterworld), born and raised in Waco

Music

 Wade Bowen, Texas country artist and former lead singer of Wade Bowen and West 84, was born and raised in Waco
 David Crowder Band (1996–2012), a Christian worship band, is from Waco
 Johnny Gimble, two time Grammy Award winning pioneer in Texas Swing and country music had the first locally made television variety show KWTX-TV. He moved to Nashville, Tennessee in 1968 to become a top rated session musician with Chet Atkins and others. Johnny's son Dick Gimble carries on the family tradition of music as a tenured professor at McLennan Community College for nearly four decades, and his granddaughter Emily Gimble carries on the tradition as an Austin, Texas musician
 Pat Green, Country music singer-songwriter, was raised in Waco and his parents still reside there
 Roy Hargrove, a Grammy Award-winning jazz trumpeter, was born and raised in Waco
 Kari Jobe, a two-time Dove Award-winning Christian singer-songwriter was born in Waco and was raised in Watauga and Hurst, Texas
 Willie Nelson, country music singer-songwriter, was born in nearby Abbott and attended Baylor University for one year
 Ted Nugent, guitarist, along with his wife Shemane and son Rocco Nugent, live in Waco He filmed his VH1 show Surviving Nugent on his ranch in nearby China Spring.
 Domingo Ortiz, percussionist for the band Widespread Panic, grew up in Waco
 Bill Payne, keyboardist for the rock band Little Feat, was born and raised in the Waco area
 Billy Joe Shaver, Country songwriter ("Honky Tonk Heroes") and singer ("Old Chunk of Coal"), lives in Waco
 Ashlee Simpson, pop music singer, was born in Waco and raised in Dallas
 Jessica Simpson, pop music singer, was born in Abilene and raised in Waco and Dallas
 Strange Fruit Project, an underground hip hop trio, is from Waco
 Hank Thompson, was born in Waco and is a country music singer who was inducted into the Country Music Hall of Fame and Nashville Songwriters Hall of Fame
 Holly Tucker was born in Waco
 Mercy Dee Walton was born in Waco
 Tom Wilson, record producer, grew up in Waco and is buried there

Tony Thompson 1975-2007
Lead singer of R&B group HiFive was born and raised in Waco Texas

Politics

 Kip Averitt, State senator from District 22 from 2002 to 2010, and State Representative from District 56 from 1994 to 2002, and currently is a lobbyist
 Joe Barton, former US congressman representing Texas's 6th congressional district in the U.S. House of Representatives from 1985 to 2019, was born and reared in Waco
 Leon Jaworski, who prosecuted Nazi war criminals during the Nuremberg trials and then was the special prosecutor who brought down the Nixon administration during the Watergate scandal, was born and raised in Waco
 Charles R. Matthews, former mayor of Garland, Texas, member of the Texas Railroad Commission, and chancellor of the Texas State University System, is a Waco native
 Lyndon Lowell Olson Jr., former U.S. Ambassador to Sweden under President Bill Clinton, was born and raised in Waco
 William R. Poage, US Congressman who represented Texas's 11th congressional district in the U.S. House of Representatives from 1937 to 1978, was born in Waco
 Ann Richards, former governor of Texas and keynote speaker at the 1988 Democratic National Convention, was born in the Waco suburb of Lacy Lakeview and graduated from Baylor University
 Pete Sessions, US congressman who represented Texas's 32nd and 5th congressional district in the U.S. House of Representatives from 1997 to 2019, was born and raised in Waco
 Ralph Sheffield, member of the Texas House of Representatives from Bell County and restaurateur in Temple, was born in Waco in 1955
 David McAdams Sibley Sr., former state senator (1991–2002), was mayor of Waco (1987–1988)

Other

 T. Berry Brazelton, born in Waco, was a pediatrician and author. He developed the Neonatal Behavioral Assessment Scale
 Tony Castro, bestselling author of several books and syndicated columnist, was born in Waco. He graduated from Baylor University and was a Nieman Fellow at Harvard
 Brigham Paul Doane, born in Waco, is a professional wrestler. Under the ring name "Masada", Doane achieved international recognition in the Hardcore wrestling scene
 Hallie Earle (1880–1963) was the first licensed female physician in Waco, a 1902 M.S. from Baylor, and the only female graduate of 1907 Baylor University Medical School in Dallas
 Frank Shelby Groner (1877–1943) pastor of Columbus Avenue Baptist Church
 Heloise, of the "Hints from Heloise" column, was born in Waco. Her column addresses lifestyle hints, including consumer issues, pets, travel, food, home improvement, health, and much more
 Allene Jeanes (1906–1995), a chemical engineer whose work included the development of Dextran and Xanthan gum, was born in Waco and received her bachelor's degree from Baylor University in 1928
 Reh Jones, born in Waco, American YouTube personality, owner, producer
 David Koresh, leader of the Branch Davidians, died along with 75 others in the blaze during the Waco siege
 Robert L. Leuschner Jr. was born in Waco. He attended Rice University, followed a career in the U.S. Navy and retired as a Rear Admiral
 Vivienne Malone-Mayes, Waco-born mathematician, the first African-American faculty member of Baylor University who developed novel methods of teaching mathematics
 Robert W. McCollum (1925–2010), virologist who made important discoveries regarding polio and hepatitis
 Glenn McGee, born in Waco, is a bioethicist, syndicated columnist for Hearst Newspapers and for The Scientist and scholar.
 Doris (Dorie) Miller, born in Waco, was an African American cook in the United States Navy and a hero during the attack on Pearl Harbor on December 7, 1941. He was the first African American to be awarded the Navy's second-highest honor, the Navy Cross. Actor Cuba Gooding Jr. portrayed Miller in the 2001 movie Pearl Harbor
 C. Wright Mills, born in Waco, was a sociologist. Among other topics, he was concerned with the responsibilities of intellectuals in post-World War II society, and advocated relevance and engagement over disinterested academic observation
 Mark W. Muesse, born in Waco, is a philosopher and author
 William R. Munroe, born in Waco, vice admiral in the U.S. Navy, Commander-in-Chief, United States Fourth Fleet during World War II
 Felix Huston Robertson, born in Washington-on-the-Brazos, was a former Confederate Civil War general who became a wealthy lawyer, railroad director, and land speculator in Waco during Reconstruction
 Ford O. Rogers, born in Waco, major general in the United States Marine Corps during World War II, recipient of the Navy Cross
 Fred I. Stalkup, chemical engineer, graduated from Rice University and became a recognized expert in enhanced oil recovery
 John Willingham, a writer and historian born in Waco, served as McLennan County elections administrator from 1984 through 1992
 Robert Wilson, born in Waco, is a stage director

See also

1953 Waco tornado outbreak
 Brazos Belle
List of museums in Central Texas
Neighborhoods of Waco
Waco Mammoth National Monument
Fixer Upper
Lynching of Jesse Washington
West Fertilizer Company explosion

Notes

References

Bibliography

External links

 
 
 Waco History Project

 
Cities in Texas
Cities in McLennan County, Texas
County seats in Texas
Populated places established in 1849
1849 establishments in Texas